Tan Sri Noh bin Haji Omar (Jawi: نوح بن عمر; born 23 February 1958) is a Malaysian politician who served as the Minister of Entrepreneur Development and Cooperative for second term in the Barisan Nasional (BN) administration under former Prime Minister Ismail Sabri Yaakob from September 2021 to the collapse of the BN administration in November 2022 and the first term in the BN administration under former Prime Minister Abdullah Ahmad Badawi from March 2008 to April 2009, Minister of Urban Wellbeing, Housing and Local Government from June 2016 to the collapse of the BN administration in May 2018, Chairman of the Perbadanan Usahawan Nasional Berhad (PUNB) from June 2020 to September 2021. He also served as the Member of Parliament (MP) for Tanjong Karang from April 1995 to November 2022. He was a member of the United Malays National Organisation (UMNO), a component party of the Barisan Nasional (BN) coalition. He was also the State Chairman of BN and UMNO of Selangor.

Early life, education and early career
Noh was born on 23 February 1958 at Sungai Burong, Tanjung Karang, Selangor. He had his early education at Sekolah Rendah Kebangsaan Sungai Burong (1965), later Sekolah Menengah Aminuddin Baki (1977) and then Maktab Perguruan Temenggong Ibrahim. He continued his studies at Thames Valley University with a Bachelor of Laws.

He was a teacher in Sekolah Menengah Kebangsaan Sultan Abdul Aziz Shah in 1983 and went on to work as a legal officer at Majlis Amanah Rakyat (MARA) in 1988 before starting his own law firm, Ahmad Famy & Noh.

Political career
Noh was appointed to the cabinet by Prime Minister Abdullah Badawi as Minister for Entrepreneur and Co-operative Development after the 2008 election. On 10 April 2009, he was appointed as Minister for Agriculture and Agro-based Industry by Abdullah's successor, Prime Minister Najib Razak. Noh was dropped from the cabinet after the 2013 election before being reappointed as Minister of Urban Wellbeing, Housing and Local Government in 2016. 

Despite Barisan Nasional's poor performance in the 2018 election, which saw the coalition suffer its first defeat in a general election, Noh managed to retain his parliamentary seat with a reduced majority.

He was appointed as Minister of Entrepreneur Development and Cooperative by Prime Minister Ismail Sabri Yaakob in 2021, remaining in the role until the 2022 election. Noh was among a number of high-profile United Malay National Organisation (UMNO), a component party of BN, members not selected to contest in the 2022 election. He later claimed that he was not invited to the party's seat negotiations. The election saw BN suffer its largest ever defeat, winning only 30 seats. The poor showing prompted Noh to resign as BN and UMNO Selangor state chairman and demand the resignation of party president Ahmad Zahid Hamidi, saying that he had lost faith in the latter's leadership.

Initially handed a six-year suspension by the party during a meeting of the party's supreme council, of which he was a member, Noh requested that he be dismissed from UMNO entirely instead, which party president Zahid agreed to. Noh claimed that the suspension did not follow party procedure, as his meeting with the disciplinary board had been scheduled to be held in three days. The disciplinary action undertaken by UMNO against Noh and various other party members have been described as a purge .

Controversies
In 2005, as Deputy Minister for Internal Security, Noh made international news for his role in the Squatgate controversy concerning the alleged mistreatment of an ethnic Chinese woman by Malaysian police. In response to the revelation of mistreatment and protests by the Chinese government, Noh stated "if foreigners think that Malaysia police are brutal, please go back to their own countries and not to stay here". Noh was reprimanded by Prime Minister Abdullah Badawi, and Noh issued an apology for his comments that BBC News described as 'grudging at best'.

In 2012, Noh Omar was accused of conflict of interest and abusing his power as Minister for Agriculture and Agro-based Industry and member of parliament for Tanjong Karang for entering a joint-venture to run a prawn farm in 2011 on 30-acres of land, which he had allegedly bought for RM100,000 at below market price, with the certificate of ownership being issued by the Selangor Land Ownership Registrar in September 2009, five months after Noh was appointed to his current cabinet position. Under the joint-venture's agreement, Noh had given consent to Pristine Agrofood Sdn Bhd to operate the prawn farm on the land for 10 years for at least RM25,200 per year. Documents also showed that Noh inked a private caveat sought by Pristine Agrofood to not sell the land for 10 years.

Noh Omar was also questioned over the Programme of Peoples' Rice Subsidy Voucher or SUBUR (Malay: Baucer Subsidi Beras Untuk Rakyat), formed to manage the distribution of rice for needy peoples, introduced when he was the Minister for Agriculture and Agro-based Industry.

In 2016, as Malaysian Minister of Urban Wellbeing, Housing and Local Government, he introduced a controversial initiative that would have enabled property developers to give out loans to buyers at an interest rate of 12 per cent with collateral and 18 per cent without collateral. Noh said that the move was intended to assist Malaysians who had been unable to get a full housing loan from banks or those who may only be given a partial housing loan.
The proposal was lauded by the Malaysian Real Estate and Housing Developers’ Association (Rehda) as it claimed that it  helps developers who were  finding it difficult to sell homes as more home buyers were being denied loans by banks.
However, the proposal was met with fierce opposition, including from his fellow cabinet member, Second Finance Minister Johari Abdul Ghani who deemed the proposal "illogical and unsustainable", The Malaysian National House Buyers Association as well as CIMB chairman Datuk Seri Nazir Razak who labelled the idea "dangerous".

In the lead-up to the 2018 Malaysian general election, Noh was one of seven MPs from the ruling Barisan Nasional coalition named on electoral watchdog Bersih's "Election Offenses Hall of Shame". He was criticised for misusing resources from the Ministry of Urban Wellbeing, Housing and Local Government, which he is the minister of, to hold campaign events in Gombak. He was also recorded giving out cash while campaigning in the area, which was held by then Selangor chief minister Azmin Ali. Bersih, a non-governmental organsation dedicated to electoral reform referred to the act as "bribery" and "an attempt to unduly influence voters".

During a parliamentary seating in April 2019, he made a series of controversial remarks, stating that “Stealing is not wrong, only when you are arrested it becomes wrong. Riding a motorcycle without a helmet is not wrong; only when the police arrest you, it becomes wrong.” Noh Omar gave the analogy while trying to demand equal treatment for politicians entering schools, as principals who had allowed him to enter their premises had been warned by the State Education Department, as existing regulations necessitated that politicians receive clearance from the State Education Departments before any school visits. Noh claimed that this regulation was not enforced by previous Barisan Nasional governments, whilst RSN Rayer from the Democratic Action Party, a component of the then-ruling Pakatan Harapan coalition countered that its members of parliament were denied entry to visit schools by respective State Education Departments under previous Barisan Nasional governments when they were part of the opposition.

Personal life 

Noh is married to Prof. Dr. Aishah Salleh and the couple has one daughter; Nurul Syazwani. In 2006, he married Nooraisha Farizan and the couple have 2 sons; Muhammad Nur Isyraff and one daughter.

Election results

Honours

Honours of Malaysia
  :
  Officer of the Order of the Defender of the Realm (KMN) (1999)
  Commander of the Order of Loyalty to the Crown of Malaysia (PSM) – Tan Sri (2016)
  :
  Companion Class I of the Order of Malacca (DMSM) – Datuk (2000)
  Grand Commander of the Order of Malacca (DGSM) – Datuk Seri (2009)
  :
  Knight Companion of the Order of Sultan Ahmad Shah of Pahang (DSAP) – Dato' (2005)
  :
  Recipient of the Meritorious Service Medal (PJK) (1994)
  Member of the Order of Sultan Salahuddin Abdul Aziz Shah (ASA) (1996)
  Knight Commander of the Order of the Crown of Selangor (DPMS) – Dato' (2001)

References

External links
 

 
 

1958 births
Living people
People from Selangor
Malaysian people of Malay descent
Malaysian Muslims
20th-century Malaysian lawyers
Former United Malays National Organisation politicians
Members of the Dewan Rakyat
Government ministers of Malaysia
Agriculture ministers of Malaysia
Officers of the Order of the Defender of the Realm
Commanders of the Order of Loyalty to the Crown of Malaysia
Knights Commander of the Order of the Crown of Selangor
21st-century Malaysian politicians